Lajas Blancas is a corregimiento in Cémaco District, Comarca Emberá, Panama with a population of 9,390 as of 2010. It was created by Law 22 of November 8, 1983. Its population as of 1990 was 2,662; its population as of 2000 was 2,638.

References

Corregimientos of Comarca Emberá-Wounaan